The Zastava Master FLG is a 9mm submachine gun developed by Zastava Arms in the early 1990s in Yugoslavia. The FLG was designed with police and special forces in mind and was made from plastic and steel.

Design details
The Zastava Master FLG is gas operated submachine gun based on M70 design, but also incorporates some design features found on MP5. Special attention has been given to safety and ergonomic details and to prevent accidental firing when the gun is dropped or bumped. Weapon fires from a closed, fully locked rotating bolt. An internal lever blocks the triggering mechanism if the bolt is not fully closed.

All principle operations can be executed without moving the firing finger from the trigger guard. The gun features upper (ambidextrous) and lower magazine catch.

Variants
Master FLG basic version

Master FLG P version with integral M.91-4 silencer

Master FLG K short barreled version with finger slip vertical forward grip handguards.

See also
Zastava Arms
Norinco Type 79
PP-19-1 Vityaz
PP-19 Bizon
PP-90M1
RATMIL M96

References

Zastava Arms
9mm Parabellum submachine guns
Serbian design